Cameraria hamameliella is a moth of the family Gracillariidae. It is known from Ontario, Québec, and Nova Scotia in Canada and throughout the eastern United States.

The larvae feed on Hamamelis species, including Hamamelis virginiana. They mine the leaves of their host plant. The mine has the form of a blotch mine on the upperside of the leaf. The mine is whitish and sometimes almost circular. The pupa of the
summer brood is formed beneath a flat silken cocoon.

This species was first described by August Busck in 1903.

References

External links
Bug Guide

Cameraria (moth)
Moths of North America
Lepidoptera of Canada
Leaf miners
Moths described in 1903
Taxa named by August Busck
Lepidoptera of the United States